Frenchman’s Bay is a small bay between South Shields and Marsden Grotto, Tyne and Wear. The O.S. grid reference is NZ392660.

See also
Geordie dialect words

External links
  Frenchman’s Bay from the South
  A bit of Frenchman's Bay - by James Shotton
  Frenchman,s Bay, South Shields by Charles George Jefferson
 Cliffs to the south of Frenchman's Bay, South Shields

Bays of England
Landforms of Tyne and Wear